Syed Jibran (born 14 October 1979, Jehlum) is a Pakistani actor and entrepreneur. He started his career with Pakistan Television Network. He made his cinema debut  with Ghabrana Nahi Hai in 2022.

Early life and education
Born into a Pathan family, he complete year 8 to year 12 at Cadet College Hasanabdal (CCH)- an elite and academically very selective boarding high school located 60 km from the twin cities of Rawalpindi and Islamabad.

At CCH he excelled in several sports including swimming, basketball and cricket, and won the highly coveted ‘Best Sportsman of the Year’ award in the year 12. He also started acting in school plays from year 9 onwards and by year 12 had a solid reputation as a character actor in comedy roles.

After graduating from CCH in 1998, he started his MBBS studies at Bahawalpur Medical College and later transferred to Rawalpindi Medical College, where he completed his MBBS degree.

Personal life 
In 2011, he married Afifa Jibran. Both of them have three children, two daughters named Eva Jibran and Isaiah Jibran, and one son named Yoel Syed Jibran.

Career 
In 2000, Jibran began to pursue his acting career. During the 3rd year of his studies, he decided to pursue for a chance in an acting stint on television.  He went around asking for a role in a television drama, but was either politely refused or put on hold. Finally in 2001, after 8 months of rejections he was cast in a 2 scene role in a single play "Hook" for Pakistan Television Network Islamabad, directed by Taufeeq Hussain Shah. He later performed in "Dada in Trouble" for Pakistan Television Network.

After that, his mentor Tariq Meraj made sure that he worked  on his shortcomings and improved his craft by working with him on many projects. It took him 2 years to make it to Lahore, where he landed the role of Bond in the famous sitcom Jutt and Bond sitcom for Indus TV. After working for a year on the sitcom, he moved to Karachi, where he performed in soap operas Tum Mere Ho and Tere Jaanay ke baad.

He currently owns several restaurants.

Filmography

Television

Films

References

1979 births
Living people
Pashtun people
Punjabi people
Pakistani male television actors
People from Jhelum